Song Yoo-jung (June 8, 1994 – January 23, 2021) was a South Korean actress and model. Song made her acting debut in the MBC series Golden Rainbow (2013). She gained viewers' attention for her performance in the same cable channel series Make a Wish (2014). She also appeared in the television series School 2017 (2017).

She was a model for Estee Lauder cosmetics, The Body Shop, and a spokesperson for Baskin Robbins ice cream.

On January 25, 2021, her agency Sublime Artist Agency announced to the media that the actress had died due to an unknown cause.

Filmography

Television series

References

External links
 
 
 

1994 births
2021 deaths
21st-century South Korean actresses
South Korean television actresses